Plati (before 1956: Καναλουπού - Kanaloupou) is a village in the municipal unit of Filiatra, Messenia, Greece. Its population, according to the 2011 census, was 71. The village is surrounded mainly by farmlands.

Population

History
According to the Venetian census of 1690, it had a population of 127. Springs supplying water to Filiatra emanate from Plati, where three watermills were located.

See also
List of settlements in Messenia

References

External links
 Municipality of Filiatra web page 
 Plati at the GTP travel pages

Populated places in Messenia